William Edward Daily (August 30, 1927 – September 4, 2018) was an American actor and comedian known for his sitcom work as Major Roger Healey on I Dream of Jeannie, and Howard Borden on The Bob Newhart Show.

Early life and early career
Willard Carroll Smith James Daily was born on August 30, 1927, in Des Moines, Iowa, the son of Fern Ellis and Raymonde Daily. Two weeks after his son was born, Daily's father left his home to buy a loaf of bread and never returned. In 1939, Daily and his family moved from Des Moines to Chicago, Illinois, where he spent the rest of his youth. Following graduation from Lane Technical High School, Daily studied for a time at the Peterson Theatre School, then left home to become a professional musician, playing upright bass with jazz bands in numerous clubs across the Midwest. In the early 1950s, he was drafted into the United States Army, serving in the Korean War with an artillery unit and later with an entertainment unit.

Comedy career

1950s to early 1960s
Following his time in the Army, Daily began performing stand-up comedy and gradually began playing some of the bigger clubs in the U.S.  After graduating from the Goodman Theatre School, Daily worked for the NBC television station WMAQ in Chicago as an announcer and floor manager. He eventually became a staff director. Daily stated that preparing for a Chicago-area Emmy Award telecast, he asked a young Bob Newhart to come up with a routine about press agents that resulted in the routine "Abe Lincoln vs. Madison Avenue". During his days off, Daily drove to Cleveland to write, direct and perform on The Mike Douglas Show. In 1963, Steve Allen appeared on The Mike Douglas Show, saw Daily do a comedy bit and offered him a job in Los Angeles as an announcer, writer and performer on his syndicated show.

Mid-1960s to early 1970s

Daily appeared in guest spots on My Mother the Car, The Farmer's Daughter and Bewitched, before veteran sitcom writer Sidney Sheldon took notice of Daily's work and hired him for the supporting role of Army Captain Roger Healey, on I Dream of Jeannie, in 1965. As astronaut Tony Nelson's best friend and NASA colleague, Roger often helped to solve the absurd social, military or other existential dilemmas that Nelson's sultry-but-naive genie (Barbara Eden) would unwittingly cause one or both of them at Cape Kennedy, during the early years of NASA's Mercury, Gemini, and Apollo programs.

In 1972, two years after I Dream of Jeannie was canceled, Daily was back on television in a non-military aviator's uniform, as Howard Borden in The Bob Newhart Show. Borden, a commercial airline navigator who later becomes a co-pilot, lives across the hall from Bob Newhart's Bob Hartley character. He frequently pops into the Hartleys' apartment to borrow things, mooch a meal, or have the Hartleys take care of his visiting son.

Mid-1970s to 1990s
Daily occasionally served as a panelist on the 1970s CBS game show Match Game. After Richard Dawson's departure, Daily was a semi-regular for the final three years of the show's CBS and syndicated run.

For the two years that followed The Bob Newhart Show, Daily returned to stand-up, but in 1980, after years of making a living as a second banana, Daily was offered his own show. Called Small & Frye, the show featured Daily as a neurotic doctor; it lasted only three months before being canceled. Daily, a lifelong lover of magic, made three syndicated specials introducing young magicians, called Bill Daily's Hocus-Pocus Gang, which aired in 1982 and 1983.

In 1987, Daily was named director of the New Mexico Film Commission.

In 1988, Daily tried his hand again at starring roles, this time as another doctor on the sitcom Starting From Scratch.  The show fared slightly better than Frye, but was canceled after one season. Daily's most notable post-Newhart role was another supporting character, that of Larry the psychiatrist on the cult favorite ALF (1986). Jack Riley appeared as an unnamed patient, clearly reprising Elliot Carlin from The Bob Newhart Show. ALF claimed to have learned all he knew about psychology from watching the earlier series.

During the 1980s and early 1990s, Daily reprised his I Dream of Jeannie role of Roger Healey in two made-for-TV reunion movies: I Dream of Jeannie... Fifteen Years Later (1985) and I Still Dream of Jeannie (1991). In 1990, he reunited with Bob Newhart as a new, overbearing neighbor in the Newhart episode "Good Neighbor Sam". Also in 1991, he reprised the role of Howard Borden in The Bob Newhart Show: The 19th Anniversary Special, which aired in November of that year. In 1997, he was a guest star on Caroline in the City.

Although mostly retired, Daily still did some live comedy and occasional television guest appearances into the 2000s. From 2006 to February 2009, he was a guest host on radio station KBQI in Albuquerque.

Personal life and death
Daily married his first wife, Patricia Anderson, in 1949; in 1976, the couple divorced. Daily had two adopted children: a son, Patrick, and a daughter, Kimberley, who is deceased. In 1980, he married Vivian Sanchez, with whom he traveled on the road, performing Lover's Leap for two years. He and Sanchez later divorced.

In 1993, Daily married his third wife, Becky. The couple remained together until her death in 2010. His manager and publicist was Patterson Lundquist.

Daily died of natural causes on September 4, 2018, in Santa Fe, New Mexico, five days after turning 91. His death was announced by his family three days later and his ashes were scattered nearby.

Filmography

References

Notes

Citations

External links

 
 

1927 births
2018 deaths
20th-century American comedians
20th-century American male actors
20th-century American male musicians
20th-century American musicians
United States Army personnel of the Korean War
American jazz double-bassists
American male comedians
American male film actors
American male jazz musicians
American male television actors
Comedians from Illinois
Jazz musicians from Illinois
Male actors from Albuquerque, New Mexico
Male actors from Chicago
Male actors from Des Moines, Iowa
Male double-bassists
Military personnel from Iowa
Musicians from Des Moines, Iowa
Musicians from New Mexico